Evgheni Hmaruc (born 13 June 1977) is a Moldovan former professional footballer who played as a goalkeeper.

Club career
He was loaned to Constructorul Cioburciu in March 2002.

He joined CSKA Sofia in February 2004, signing a -year deal.

Although his contract would run out in June 2006, he was allowed on trial at FC Luch-Energia Vladivostok in January 2006 before moving back to Tiligul Tiraspol.
In January 2018 he was loaned to Persikabo.

International career
Hmaruc had made 30 appearances for the senior Moldova national football team, including as no.1 goalkeeper of 2006 FIFA World Cup qualification (UEFA).

References

External links

1977 births
Living people
People from Tiraspol
Footballers from Transnistria
Moldovan footballers
Moldova international footballers
Expatriate footballers in Russia
Moldovan expatriate sportspeople in Russia
Association football goalkeepers
FC Nistru Cioburciu players
CS Tiligul-Tiras Tiraspol players
FC Chernomorets Novorossiysk players
FC Tiraspol players
Nea Salamis Famagusta FC players
Cypriot First Division players
Expatriate footballers in Cyprus
Moldovan expatriate sportspeople in Cyprus
FC Dynamo Saint Petersburg players
PFC CSKA Sofia players
PFC Cherno More Varna players
Expatriate footballers in Indonesia
Moldovan expatriate sportspeople in Indonesia
Persija Jakarta players
Indonesian Premier Division players
Expatriate footballers in Bulgaria
Moldovan expatriate sportspeople in Bulgaria
First Professional Football League (Bulgaria) players
FC Nistru Otaci players
FC Tighina players
FC Dinamo-Auto Tiraspol players